Sheila Manahan (1 January 1924 – 29 March 1988) was an Irish actress.

Career

Among her film roles were Ann Willingdon in Seven Days to Noon (1950), Esther's mother in The Story of Esther Costello (1957), and Mrs. Jenkins in Only Two Can Play (1962), with Peter Sellers and Mai Zetterling.

Personal life
Sheila Manahan was married to the actor Fulton Mackay. She died in west London on 29 March 1988 at the age of 64; her body was buried at East Sheen Cemetery, alongside Mackay's

Filmography

References

External links 

 
 

1924 births
1988 deaths
Irish film actresses
20th-century Irish actresses